The Arsiani Range or (arsianis k’edi) is a mountain range in Eastern Anatolia Region, northeast Turkey, and the Autonomous Republic of Adjara, southwest Georgia. The range, continuing the Lesser Caucasus to the Armenian Highlands, forms the watershed between the river valleys of Çoruh/Chorokhi and Kura/Mtkvari. The highest peak is that of "Yalnızçam" or "Arsiani" (3,165 m).

See also 
 Q'ueli

References 

Mountain ranges of Georgia (country)
Mountain ranges of Turkey
Eastern Anatolia Region
Geography of Adjara
Important Bird Areas of Turkey